John Rumble (born 27 August 1933) is a past member of the Canadian Equestrian Team in eventing. He won a team bronze medal in eventing at the 1956 Summer Olympics in Stockholm, together with teammates Jim Elder and Brian Herbinson.  He placed 16th in individual eventing. John had 2 children that were born after his reign in Equestrian. He is now retired in Toronto.

References

External links 
 

1933 births
Living people
Canadian male equestrians
Olympic bronze medalists for Canada
Equestrians at the 1956 Summer Olympics
Olympic medalists in equestrian
Medalists at the 1956 Summer Olympics